The Zimbabwe cricket team toured the Netherlands in June 2019 to play two One Day Internationals (ODIs) and two Twenty20 International (T20I) matches. The two teams last faced each other in an ODI match at the 2003 Cricket World Cup, with Zimbabwe winning by 99 runs. The last time the two sides played a T20I match against each other was during the 2014 ICC World Twenty20 tournament, with Zimbabwe winning by five wickets.

The Netherlands won the ODI series 2–0. It was their first ever ODI series win against a Full Member side. The T20I series was drawn 1–1, with Zimbabwe winning the second match in a Super Over.

Squads

ODI series

1st ODI

2nd ODI

T20I series

1st T20I

2nd T20I

References

External links
 Series home at ESPN Cricinfo

2019 in Dutch cricket
2019 in Zimbabwean cricket
International cricket competitions in 2019
International cricket tours of the Netherlands